New Durham may refer to:

Places 
In Canada
 Located near Norwich, Ontario

In the United Kingdom
 New Durham, Durham, east of Durham

In the United States
 New Durham Township, LaPorte County, Indiana
 New Durham, New Hampshire
 New Durham, Middlesex County, New Jersey
 New Durham, North Bergen, New Jersey

See also 
 Durham (disambiguation)